Bilbo's rain frog (Breviceps bagginsi) is an amphibian species in the family Brevicipitidae, endemic to South Africa. The frog was named after Bilbo Baggins, the main character from The Hobbit by J.R.R Tolkien. The frog was named as such because the scientist who discovered it (L.R Minter) used to read the novel to his children. Its natural habitats are temperate grasslands and edges of wood plantations, wherein it spends most of its time in its burrow. The species is threatened by construction, maintenance of roads, silviculture, general habitat degradation/habitat loss, and by road traffic. As a result, it is listed as Near Threatened in the IUCN Red List of Threatened Species.

Description 
Breviceps bagginsi is a microhylid (narrow-mouthed) frog from the family of Brevicipitidae and was discovered in the year 2003. The body size of male individuals varies from 20 to 25.9 mm and females measure approximately 28.7 mm in length. With its highly truncated snout it is well adapted to its burrowing lifestyle. They have a characteristic tympanic membrane and their pupil is horizontally ecliptic.

The dorsum of Breviceps bagginsi is a medium to dark brown and it has fairly granular skin texture with darkly pigmented tubercles, each containing openings of 2-6 dermal glands. The ventrum is smooth and of light color. Breviceps bagginsi has a black stripe running from its eye to the origin of its arm. They have a lighter bar between the eyes and a white stripe from their lower eyelid to their mouth. The sides of its body are brown with a few white speckles.

As all species from Brevicipitidae, Breviceps bagginsi lack sphenethmoids, and a middle ear. Sphenethmoids are the bone of the skull surrounding the anterior end of an amphibian's brain.

Distribution, habitat and ecology 
Breviceps bagginsi only occur in South Africa. They live on edges of wood plantations in Kwazulu-Natal midlands of southeastern South Africa along the mist belt from Boston in the west to Melmoth in the north-east and down to the coast at Mkambati. They occur in an elevation range of 25–1400 m ASL (meters above sea level).

The Mkambati area is protected due to its biodiversity and therefore high conservation value. The Breviceps bagginsi population in this area lives in undisturbed grasslands.

Behavior

Sexual behavior and lifespan 
Their mating call has two different call bouts, both at a frequency of 2552 Hz. Males produce their mating call while underneath vegetation to protect them from the heat. Due to the frog's sensitivity to dry heat, mating calls last longer during cooler wetter weather.

As a member of the genus Breviceps, Breviceps bagginsi shows sexual dimorphism, and the males are much smaller than the females. Unlike other frogs, Breviceps males have very short limbs relative to their body size. Therefore, they are not able to amplex the females during the process of mating, but with an adhesive secretion they can adhere to the body of the female. While the male remains adhered to the female, she carries him on her back until the pair can find a place to burrow, and the female then lays her clutch of 20-50 eggs in their nest.

Breeding occurs in subterranean nests during spring and summer. Offspring hatch fully developed from eggs directly. Offspring also develop further in the burrows, as rain frogs do not have a free-swimming tadpole stage, and emerge from them once fully mature.

Similar to the other members of Breviceps, Bilbo's rain frog has a life span ranging from 4 to 15 years.

Burrowing/locomotive behavior and defense behavior 
Much like the other members of Breviceps, Breviceps bagginsi burrows in subterranean nests underneath the clay loam their habitats usually harbor. The frog stays in the burrow until it is wet enough on the surface for it to come out. Breviceps bagginsi's hind legs and feet are strong and highly adapted for burrowing. When burrowing, the frog buries itself backwards rapidly. Bilbo's rain frog also runs rather than jumping (as do the other members of Breviceps).

When threatened, Breviceps "puff up" to appear larger and more threatening, they do this by inflating their lungs. Breviceps also secrete a sticky white substance from their skin, and sometimes emit a harsh shriek as a defense mechanism.

Feeding behavior and diet 
Breviceps bagginsi is both a terrestrial and fossorial amphibian, and therefore it spends a great deal of time in its burrow, but once termites emerge they leave their nests to feed. Breviceps bagginsi is an insectivore, and they also feed upon ants, beetles, moths, woodlice, amphipods, juvenile millipedes, caterpillars, and other small arthropods.

Status 
On the IUCN Red List of Threatened Species Breviceps bagginsi was listed as data deficient until 2010. In 2017 it was relisted as Near Threatened because of the small area of occurrence (11'000 km2) and the declining area of occupancy, which is only 10% of the occurrence (1'100 km2). Although their occupancy is declining, their occurrence remains the same. Furthermore, Breviceps bagginsi live in extremely fragmented subpopulations and the quality of their habitat is decreasing due to sylviculture and construction and maintenance of roads.

Subpopulation sizes are around 20-30 individuals. Distances between subpopulations are too long to allow dissemination within one generation.

References

Breviceps
Endemic amphibians of South Africa
Amphibians described in 2003
Taxonomy articles created by Polbot
Organisms named after Tolkien and his works